John Branyan (born 1965) is an American comedian and writer. He is known for his clean stand-up comedy.

Career
Branyan has been a professional comedian since prior to 1997. Although best known for performing stand-up comedy, he also performs improv comedy with the troupe Think Tank. He has written for the American Comedy Network. He co-wrote and performed in the theatrical presentation, Crazy Love, which was on a national tour for three years.

He has participated in Jay Leno's National Comedy Competition and has been featured on nine recorded comedy projects with people like Ken Davis, David Jeremiah, Ted Cunningham and Tim Hawkins.

Branyan's mock-Shakespearean version of The Three Little Pigs has been viewed  nearly 2 million times on YouTube.com. His book version, A Triune Tale of Diminutive Swine, is in its third reprinting.

He is the inventor of a comedy writing system, Active Notebook.

Personal life
He and his wife, Lori, have been married since about 1986. They have four children (Mandy, Tim, Tabby and Andrew) and eight grandchildren. Branyan is a Christian.

He enjoys playing board games.

References

Notes

External links

1965 births
Living people
21st-century American comedians